El Hadji Ousmane Dabo (born 8 February 1977) is a French former professional footballer who played as a midfielder.

Dabo played for Rennes, Inter Milan, Vicenza, Parma, Monaco, Atalanta, Lazio, Manchester City and New England Revolution. He represented France three times at full international level.

Early life
Dabo was born in Laval, Mayenne.

Club career

Early career
Dabo started his career at Rennes, before he and team-mate Mikaël Silvestre were signed by Inter Milan in 1998. Dabo was not a regular first team player for Inter, and a few months later he was loaned out to Vicenza, where he made 13 Serie A appearances. Dabo spent the following season at Parma under Arrigo Sacchi, making sixteen appearances. In June 2000, Inter stated Silvestre and Dabo were bought for only ₤3 million and sold for ₤30 million. In June 2000 he changed clubs again, returning to the French league with Monaco in an exchange deal involving Sabri Lamouchi. Six months later he returned to Vicenza on loan, and in the close season made a permanent move to Atalanta.  At the Bergamo club he secured regular first team football, and in 2003 he gained a call-up to the France national team for the FIFA Confederations Cup, which Dabo described as "a surprise".

Lazio
In summer of 2003 Dabo joined Lazio, along with team-mate Luciano Zauri, at first a co-ownership deal but raised to a total of €3.225 million and €5.65 million transfer fees after Lazio bought duo remain rights in June 2004. Dabo became an important and popular part of the Lazio midfield due to his organised style of play, making 79 appearances for the club.

Manchester City
After interest from a variety of Premier League clubs in 2006, Dabo joined Manchester City on a Bosman transfer, signing a three-year contract. Dabo cited a positive impression of the club arising from a friendly between Manchester City and Lazio at the City of Manchester Stadium as one of his main reasons for joining Manchester City. His debut for the club came in the opening match of the season, a 3–0 Premier League defeat to Chelsea. On his third City appearance he received a red card for an aerial challenge with Reading's Steve Sidwell, and was suspended for three matches. However, a knee ligament injury sustained in training resulted in a much longer absence, and he did not make another appearance until mid-December. He then had a run of thirteen consecutive appearances, but was sidelined by injury. Upon his return to fitness he struggled to regain his place in the team, making only one further appearance in the 2006–07 season.

Confrontation with Joey Barton
On 1 May 2007, Dabo was assaulted by his team mate Joey Barton at City's training ground. Dabo stated that he had been hit several times, and had to go to hospital after suffering injuries to his head during the incident, including a suspected detached retina.  Dabo requested that the police press charges against Barton, and as a result, on 16 May 2007, Barton was arrested and questioned by Greater Manchester Police. Barton pleaded guilty to the assault. Barton later claimed on 8 April 2011 that, in fact it was Dabo who started the fight, and he was merely defending himself. After Barton signed for Marseille on 1 September 2012 on a season-long loan, Dabo questioned the arrival of the Englishman at the Rhone club and called his former teammate a coward for constantly hitting him when he was face down on the floor.

Return to Lazio
He was put on the transfer list by Sven-Göran Eriksson along with team mates Danny Mills and Paul Dickov. Mills and Dickov both ended up going out on loans, but Dabo remained at the club. After just playing the League Cup game on 29 August 2007, he finally re-signed for Lazio on 30 January 2008, cost only €263,000. He signed a contract until 30 June 2010. On 13 May 2009, he scored the winning penalty in a penalty shoot-out to give Lazio a 6–5 win after a 1–1 draw, over Sampdoria in the 2009 Coppa Italia Final.

New England Revolution
After seven months without a club, Dabo signed with Major League Soccer club New England Revolution on 8 February 2011. He made his MLS debut on 7 May 2011 in a game against the Colorado Rapids.

Dabo retired from football on 18 July 2011 after struggling with injuries throughout the 2011 MLS season.

Honours
Lazio
Coppa Italia: 2003–04, 2008–09
Supercoppa Italiana: 2009

France
FIFA Confederations Cup: 2003

References

External links

 
 archivio.inter.it
 sslazio.it 
 
 
 

1977 births
Living people
People from Laval, Mayenne
Sportspeople from Mayenne
French footballers
France international footballers
Association football midfielders
Stade Lavallois players
Stade Rennais F.C. players
Inter Milan players
L.R. Vicenza players
Parma Calcio 1913 players
AS Monaco FC players
Atalanta B.C. players
S.S. Lazio players
Manchester City F.C. players
New England Revolution players
Ligue 1 players
Serie A players
Premier League players
Major League Soccer players
2003 FIFA Confederations Cup players
FIFA Confederations Cup-winning players
French expatriate footballers
Expatriate footballers in England
Expatriate footballers in Italy
Expatriate soccer players in the United States
French expatriate sportspeople in England
French expatriate sportspeople in Italy
French expatriate sportspeople in the United States
Black French sportspeople
Footballers from Pays de la Loire